The women's 100 metres T53 event at the 2020 Summer Paralympics in Tokyo, took place on 1 September 2021.

Records
Prior to the competition, the existing records were as follows:

Results
The final took place on 1 September 2021, at 20:37:

References

Women's 100 metres T53
2021 in women's athletics